Red Nose Day 2009 was a fund-raising event organised by Comic Relief, broadcast live on BBC One and BBC Two from the evening of 13 March 2009 to early the following morning. It was part of the "Do Something Funny For Money" campaign. It was held on Friday 13 March till Saturday 14 March 2009 from 7:00 pm to 3:45 am on BBC One.

Presenters

Donation Progress

13 March 2009
The Mount Kilimanjaro total was £3,500,000. The Wine Relief total was £750,000. A notable, single donation of £6,000,000 was donated by an anonymous donor. £501,863 was raised by Ryman. Foxybingo.com raised £150,000. Subway managed to raise £407,763.

14 March 2009

Sketches

Musical Performances

The Show

Top of the Pops

BBC Two's special Comic Relief edition of Top of the Pops, drew an impressive 6.73m (31.6%) over 35 minutes.

Features

Let's Dance for Comic Relief

Best bits from the series so far.

Comic Relief Does The Apprentice

Pre-recorded final installment.

The BT Red Nose Climb
The BT Red Nose Climb saw nine celebrities successfully scale 19,330 feet (5,890 m) to reach the summit of Africa's highest mountain to raise money for Comic Relief. On 27 February 2009, Gary Barlow, Ronan Keating, Chris Moyles, Ben Shephard, Cheryl Cole, Kimberley Walsh, Denise Van Outen, Fearne Cotton, and Alesha Dixon set off to Tanzania to tackle Mount Kilimanjaro with project manager and guide Jeremy Gane of Charity Challenge. The Climb has already raised in excess of £3.5 million with over £1.8 million coming from the audience of BBC Radio 1 (a record for the station.) All nine celebrities reached the summit of Mount Kilimanjaro on Saturday, 7 March 2009. Cheryl Cole, Fearne Cotton, Denise Van Outen and Ben Shephard reached the summit first at sunrise.  On Thursday 12 March 2009 BBC One's 'Kilimanjaro: The Big Red Nose Climb' was seen by 8.74m viewers (36.6% share). British Prime Minister Gordon Brown met with the group upon their return to the United Kingdom and congratulated the "nine heroes" on their achievement, saying that they were "inspiring a generation of kids who would never have thought about these things".

Cast and Reporters

 Adam Clayton
 Adele
 Adrian Chiles
 Al Murray
 Alan Carr
 Alan Sugar
 Alesha Dixon
 Alex Kapranos
 Alexander Armstrong
 Andy Bell
 Anjli Mohindra
 Annie Lennox
 Anthony McPartlin
 Ashley Cole
 Ben Miller
 Ben Shephard
 Bono
 Carol Vorderman
 Caroline Aherne
 Catherine Tate
 Cheryl Cole
 Chris Moyles
 Chris Sharrock
 Christine Bleakley
 Claire Skinner
 Claudia Winkleman
 Craig Cash
 Daniel Anthony
 Daniel Radcliffe
 Daniel Roche
 Danielle Lloyd
 Danny O'Donoghue
 David Baddiel
 David Beckham
 David Mitchell

 David Tennant
 David Walliams
 Davina McCall
 Deborah Meaden
 Declan Donnelly
 Denise van Outen
 Dominic Wood
 Duncan Bannatyne
 The Edge
 Edith Bowman
 Elisabeth Sladen
 Emma Watson
 Ewan McGregor
 Fearne Cotton
 Fern Britton
 Fiona Phillips
 Flo Rida
 Frankie Sandford
 French and Saunders
 Gok Wan
 Gary Barlow
 Gem Archer
 Gerald Ratner
 Graham Norton
 Guy Garvey
 Harry Enfield
 Harry Hill
 Howard Donald
 Hugh Dennis
 Jack Dee
 James Caan
 James Corden
 James Morrison
 Jason Gardiner
 Jason Manford

 Jason Orange
 Jennifer Aniston
 Joanna Lumley
 Jo Brand
 John Terry
 Jonathan Ross
 Kate Moss
 Kathryn Drysdale
 Katy Brand
 Keeley Hawes
 Keith Lemon
 Kimberley Walsh
 Larry Mullen, Jr.
 Lemar
 Lenny Henry
 Louis Walsh
 Margaret Mountford
 Mark Owen
 Mark Potter
 Matt Lucas
 Mathew Horne
 Michael Parkinson
 Michelle Mone
 Miranda Hart
 Mollie King
 Nicholas McCarthy
 Nick Hewer
 Noel Fielding
 Noel Gallagher
 Omid Djalili
 Owen Coyle
 Owen Wilson
 Patsy Palmer
 Paul Thomson
 Paul Whitehouse

 Pete Turner
 Peter Crouch
 Peter Jones
 Ralf Little
 Ramona Marquez
 Reggie Yates
 Richard Jupp
 Richard McCourt
 Ricky Gervais
 Ricky Tomlinson
 Rio Ferdinand
 Rob Brydon
 Robbie Williams
 Robert Hardy
 Robert Webb
 Rochelle Wiseman
 Ronan Keating
 Ronnie Corbett
 Rory Bremner
 Ruby Wax
 Rupert Grint
 Ruth Jones
 Sadie Frost
 Sienna Miller
 Simon Cowell
 Simon Le Bon
 Stephen Merchant
 Steve Jones
 Sue Johnston
 Theo Paphitis
 Thomas Knight
 Tom Jones
 Tyger Drew-Honey
 Una Healy
 Vanessa White

References

External links
 BBC Red Nose Day Page
 Red Nose Day Official Website
 Red Nose Day Schedule

Red Nose Day
2009 in British television
2009 in the United Kingdom
March 2009 events in the United Kingdom